Bastian is a German short form of Sebastian. Notable people with the surname include:

Adolf Bastian (1826–1905), 19th-century anthropologist
Ali Bastian (born 1982), English television actress
Amy Bastian (born 1968), American neuroscientist
Anura Bastian (born 1950), Sri Lankan politician
Bob Bastian (1938–2019), American farmer and politician
Bruce Bastian (born 1948), American computer programmer and businessman
Charlie Bastian (1860–1932), American baseball player
Donald N. Bastian, Canadian bishop
Ed Bastian (born 1957), American business executive
Frank O. Bastian, American medical doctor and neuropathologist
Fritz Bastian (1898–1944), American tennis player
Gert Bastian (1923–1992), German military officer and politician
Gordon Bastian (1902–1987), British sailor
Henry Charlton Bastian (1837–1915), English zoologist, physiologist and neurologist
Hilda Bastian ( 1980s–1990s), Australian researcher
Jolly Bastian, Indian stunt master
Lan Bastian (born 1985), Indonesian footballer
Mary Bastian (1948–1985), Tamil Human Rights activist
Michael Bastian (born 1965), American fashion designer
Nathan Bastian (born 1997), Canadian ice hockey player
Nico Bastian (born 1990), German racing driver
Noah Bastian (born 1979), American actor
Peter Bastian (1943–2017), Danish musician
Stan Bastian (born 1941), American educator and politician
Stanley Bastian (born 1958), American judge
Wally Bastiansz (died 1985), Sri Lankan baila musician
Walter M. Bastian (1891–1975), American judge
Warwick Bastian (1914-1979), Australian Anglican bishop

Bastian is also a male given name:
Bastián Arce (born 1989), Chilean footballer
Bastian Badu (born 2000), French footballer
Bastian Baker (born 1991), Swiss singer and songwriter
Bastian Clevé (born 1950), German filmmaker and producer
Bastian Dankert (born 1980), German football referee
Bastian Doreth (born 1989), German basketball player
Kai-Bastian Evers (born 1990), German footballer
Bastian Heidenfelder (born 1986), German footballer
Bastian Henning (born 1983), German footballer
Bastian Hohmann (born 1990), German footballer
Didrik Bastian Juell (born 1990), Norwegian freestyle skier
Bastian Kaltenböck (born 1983), Austrian ski jumper
Bastian Kersaudy (born 1994), French badminton player
Bastian Knittel (born 1983), German tennis player
Bastian Kolmsee (born 1981), German racing driver
Bastian Kurz (born 1996), German footballer
Bastián Lizama (born 1996), Chilean badminton player
Bastian Müller (born 1991), German footballer
Bastian Obermayer (born 1977), German investigative journalist
Bastian Oczipka (born 1989), German footballer
Julius Bastian Olsen (1875–1936), Norwegian politician
Bastian Pagez ( 1566), servant of Mary, Queen of Scots
Bastian Pastewka (born 1972), German comedian
Bastian Pinske (born 1978), German footballer
Bastian Reinhardt (born 1975), German footballer
Lars Bastian Ridder Stabell (1798–1860), Norwegian politician
Bastian Roscheck (born 1991), German handball player
Bastián San Juan (born 1994), Chilean footballer
Bastian Schulz (born 1985), German footballer
Bastian Schweinsteiger (born 1984), German soccer player
Bastian Seibt (born 1978), German rower
Bastian Seidel (born 1975), Australian politician and medical doctor
Bastian Semm (born 1979), German actor
Bastian Sick (born 1965), German journalist and author
Bastián Solano Molina (born 1999), Chilean footballer
Bastian Steger (born 1981), German table tennis player
Bastian Swillims (born 1982), German sprinter
Bastian Trinker (born 1990), Austrian tennis player
Bastian Trost (born 1974), German actor
Bastian Vasquez (1990–2015), Norwegian terrorist
Bastian Winkelhaus, German card game player
Bastián Yañez (born 2001), Chilean footballer

See also
Bastian Balthazar Bux, fictional character
Bas Bron, producer and musician using the moniker Bastian.
Bastian, Virginia, a community in the U.S. state of Virginia

Notes 

German masculine given names
German-language surnames